The discography of Sanctus Real, a Christian rock band which formed in 1996.

Albums

Studio albums

Singles

As lead artist

Promotional singles

Other charted songs

Music videos

Compilation appearances
2004: In the Name of Love: Artists United for Africa – "Beautiful Day" (Sparrow)
2004: Veggie Rocks! – "Promised Land" (ForeFront)
2005: X2005 – "Everything About You", from Fight the Tide (BEC)
2005: X Worship 2006 – "Everything About You", from Fight the Tide (Worship Together)
2006: X2006 – "I'm Not Alright", from The Face of Love (BEC)
2006: X2007 – "Fly", from The Face of Love (BEC)
2006: WOW Hits 2007 – "I'm Not Alright", from The Face of Love (EMI)
2006: Unexpected Gifts (12 New Sounds of Christmas) – "Silent Night" (Sparrow)
2007: WOW Hits 2008 - "Don't Give Up", from The Face of Love (EMI)
2007: X Worship 2007 – "Eloquent", from The Face of Love (Worship Together)
2008: X Christmas – "Silent Night" (BEC)
2009: ConGRADulations! Class of 2009 – "We Need Each Other", from We Need Each Other (Interlinc)
2009: WOW Hits 2010 - "Whatever You're Doing (Something Heavenly)", from We Need Each Other (Word)
2010: WOW Hits 2011 - "Forgiven", from Pieces of a Real Heart (Word)
2010: WOW Hits 2011: Deluxe Edition - "I'm Not Alright (Broken-World Remix)", exclusive to the deluxe edition (Word)
2011: WOW #1s: Yellow - "I'm Not Alright", from The Face of Love (Word)
2011: X 2011 - "Take Over Me", from Pieces of a Real Heart (BEC)
2011: Courageous: Original Motion Picture Soundtrack - "Lead Me", from Pieces of a Real Heart
2011: WOW Hits 2012 - "Lead Me", from Pieces of a Real Heart (EMI)
2012: WOW Hits 2013 - "The Redeemer", from Pieces of a Real Heart (EMI)
2013: WOW Hits 2014: Deluxe Edition - "Pray", from Run (Capitol CMG)
2014: WOW Hits 2015: Deluxe Edition - "Lay It Down", from The Dream (Capitol CMG)

Notes

References

External links

Discographies of American artists
Rock music group discographies
Christian music discographies